Felipe Jorge Loureiro (born 2 September 1977), known as Felipe, is a Brazilian football coach and former footballer. He is the current head coach of Bangu.

A left-footed midfielder and left-back, Felipe is known for his playmaking style, that nicknamed him as Maestro, with his excellent ball control, dribbling skills, and vision for orchestrating offensive plays and providing precise passes.

Career 
Felipe arrives in Vasco da Gama as a futsal player in 1984 at 6 years old. There, he met Pedrinho, who would be his profession colleague and also personal friend. Times later, in 1990 at 12 years old, Felipe came up through the ranks of Vasco da Gama as a youth player. In 1996, Felipe received his first chance between the professionals, playing as a left back. Until 1999, Felipe stood in Vasco da Gama, getting chances in the Brazil national team and consecrating himself as one of the greatest idols of the club. After an unsuccessful negotiation to Roma and injuries in 2000, Felipe in 2001, already playing as a left side midfielder since 1999, was loaned to Palmeiras, returning to play as a left back, and, posteriorly, to Atlético Mineiro. In 2002, returns to Vasco da Gama for a short time, playing as an left side midfielder, before a negotiated and goes to a mid-season spend in Galatasaray. In 2003, Felipe returns to Brazil, playing two seasons as a right winger for Flamengo. In 2005, after polemics, made a quickly move to Fluminense after goes to Al Sadd, spending five seasons in Middle East. In 2010, Felipe returns to Vasco da Gama, 14 years after his professional debut in the club. Felipe finished his footballer career in Fluminense in 2013.

He has seven caps with the Brazil national team, the first one on 23 September 1998. He won the Copa América in 2004.

Years after his retirement as a footballer, Felipe started his career as a coach, debuting at Tigres do Brasil.

Honours

Club 
Vasco da Gama
 Brasileirão Série A (2): 1997, 2000 (Copa João Havelange)
 Copa do Brasil (1): 2011
 Copa Libertadores (1): 1998
 Campeonato Carioca (1): 1998
 Rio de Janeiro – São Paulo Tournament (1): 1999
 Copa Mercosur (1): 2000

Flamengo
 Campeonato Carioca (1): 2004

Fluminense
 Campeonato Carioca (1): 2005

Al Sadd
 Qatar Stars League (2): 2005–06, 2006–07
 Emir of Qatar Cup (1): 2006–07
 Crown Prince Cup (3): 2006, 2007, 2008
 Sheikh Jassem Cup (1): 2006–07

International 
Brazil
 Copa América (1): 2004

Individual 
 Copa do Brasil Player of Year (2): 2004, 2011
 Campeonato Carioca Player of Year (1): 2004
 Campeonato Carioca Midfielder of Year (3): 2004, 2011, 2012
 South American Team of the Year: 1998

References

External links
United Athletes Magazine Interview about the training of a midfielder.

1977 births
Living people
Brazilian footballers
Brazilian football managers
Brazilian expatriate footballers
Clube Atlético Mineiro players
Galatasaray S.K. footballers
CR Flamengo footballers
Fluminense FC players
Sociedade Esportiva Palmeiras players
CR Vasco da Gama players
Brazil international footballers
2004 Copa América players
Expatriate footballers in Qatar
Brazilian expatriate sportspeople in Turkey
Expatriate footballers in Turkey
Al Sadd SC players
Campeonato Brasileiro Série A players
Süper Lig players
Copa América-winning players
Copa Libertadores-winning players
Esporte Clube Tigres do Brasil managers
Association football forwards
Association football midfielders
Association football defenders
Qatar Stars League players
Campeonato Brasileiro Série C managers
Campeonato Brasileiro Série D managers
Bangu Atlético Clube managers
Associação Desportiva Confiança managers
Footballers from Rio de Janeiro (city)